Elachista toveella is a moth of the family Elachistidae that is endemic to Spain.

References 

toveella
Moths described in 1985
Moths of Europe
Endemic fauna of Spain